is high-rise office and residential complex in the Harumi district of Chūō, Tokyo, Japan.

It consists of four towers, one of which is significantly shorter than the others; the three tall towers are the source of the name "Triton," and the total number of four is the source of the name "Square."

Triton Square is located near Kachidoki Station on the Toei Oedo Line and Tsukishima Station on the Tokyo Metro Yurakucho Line.

References

External links

 

Skyscraper office buildings in Tokyo
Office buildings completed in 2000
Residential buildings completed in 2000
Residential skyscrapers in Tokyo